Edward Mills Purcell (August 30, 1912 – March 7, 1997) was an American physicist who shared  the 1952 Nobel Prize for Physics for his independent discovery (published 1946) of nuclear magnetic resonance in liquids and in solids.  Nuclear magnetic resonance (NMR) has become widely used to study the molecular structure of pure materials and the composition of mixtures. Friends and colleagues knew him as Ed Purcell.

Biography
Born and raised in Taylorville, Illinois, Purcell received his BSEE in electrical engineering from Purdue University, followed by his M.A. and Ph.D. in physics from Harvard University. He was a member of the Alpha Xi chapter of the Phi Kappa Sigma fraternity while at Purdue. After spending the years of World War II working at the MIT Radiation Laboratory on the development of microwave radar, Purcell returned to Harvard to do research.  In December 1946, he discovered nuclear magnetic resonance (NMR) with his colleagues Robert Pound and Henry Torrey.  NMR provides scientists with an elegant and precise way of determining chemical structure and properties of materials, and is widely used in physics and chemistry.  It also is the basis of magnetic resonance imaging (MRI), one of the most important medical advances of the 20th century.  For his discovery of NMR, Purcell shared the 1952 Nobel Prize in physics with Felix Bloch of Stanford University.

Purcell also made contributions to astronomy as the first to detect radio emissions from neutral galactic hydrogen (the famous 21 cm line due to hyperfine splitting), affording the first views of the spiral arms of the Milky Way.  This observation helped launch the field of radio astronomy, and measurements of the 21 cm line are still an important technique in modern astronomy.  He has also made  seminal contributions to solid state physics, with studies of spin-echo relaxation, nuclear magnetic relaxation, and negative spin temperature (important in the development of the laser).  With Norman F. Ramsey, he was the first to question the CP symmetry of particle physics.

Purcell was the recipient of many awards for his scientific, educational, and civic work.  He served as science advisor to Presidents Dwight D. Eisenhower, John F. Kennedy, and Lyndon B. Johnson.  He was president of the American Physical Society, and a member of the American Philosophical Society, the National Academy of Sciences, and the American Academy of Arts and Sciences.  He was awarded the National Medal of Science in 1979, and the Jansky Lectureship before the National Radio Astronomy Observatory. Purcell was also inducted into his Fraternity's (Phi Kappa Sigma) Hall of Fame as the first Phi Kap ever to receive a Nobel Prize.

Purcell was the author of the innovative introductory text Electricity and Magnetism. The book, a Sputnik-era project funded by an NSF grant, was influential for its use of relativity in the presentation of the subject at this level. The 1965 edition, now freely available due to a condition of the federal grant, was originally published as a volume of the Berkeley Physics Course. The book is also in print as a commercial third edition, as Purcell and Morin. Purcell is also remembered by biologists for his famous lecture "Life at Low Reynolds Number", in which he explained forces and effects dominating in limiting flow regimes (often at the micro scale). He also emphasized the time-reversibility of low Reynolds number flows with a principle referred to as the Scallop theorem.

Purcell died on March 7, 1997, in Cambridge, Massachusetts, at age of 84.

See also
Dynamical decoupling
J-coupling
Magnetic resonance imaging (MRI)
Neutron electric dipole moment
Spin echo
Relativistic electromagnetism

References

External links

 
 

1912 births
1997 deaths
20th-century American physicists
American Nobel laureates
American nuclear physicists
Experimental physicists
Fellows of the American Academy of Arts and Sciences
Harvard University alumni
Harvard University faculty
Massachusetts Institute of Technology faculty
National Medal of Science laureates
Nobel laureates in Physics
People from Taylorville, Illinois
Purdue University College of Engineering alumni
Winners of the Beatrice M. Tinsley Prize
Members of the United States National Academy of Sciences
Foreign Members of the Royal Society
Nuclear magnetic resonance
Time Person of the Year
Presidents of the American Physical Society